The following are international rankings of Saudi Arabia.

Cities
Riyadh

Metropolitan area by population
Most expensive cities

Communications
The World Factbook: Second number of mobile phones in use ranked
OECD: number of broadband Internet users ranked 
Economist Intelligence Unit: e-readiness 2008 ranked out of 70 countries
The second position among G20 countries for telecoms expansion

Demographics
United Nations: Population ranked out of 221 countries
 Population density ranked out of 241 countries
United Nations report World Population Policies 2005, Number of immigrants ranked out of 192 countries

Economy
 United Nations: Human Development Index, ranked out of 177 countries
Nominal GDP growth rate: ranked out of 215 countries
Nominal GDP: ranked13 out of 179 countries ($ IMF; $ World Bank; $ CIA)
Nominal GDP per capita 2006, ranked out of 179 IMF; out of 170 World Bank; out of 185 CIA
 A.T. Kearney/Foreign Policy Magazine: Globalization Index 2006, ranked out of 62 countries
 The Wall Street Journal: 2006  Index of Economic Freedom, ranked out of 155 countries
 The Economist: Worldwide Quality-of-life Index, 2005, ranked out of 111 countries
 World Economic Forum: Global Competitiveness Index 2006-2007, ranked 24 out of 125 countries
World Tourism Organization World Tourism rankings ranked out of all countries
World Economic Forum: Travel and Tourism Competitiveness Report 2008, ranked out of 130 countries

Education

According to ARWU 

1	            King Abdulaziz University	101-150
2	            King Saud University	151-200
3	            King Abdullah University of Science and Technology	201-300
4	            King Fahd University of Petroleum & Minerals	401-500

Energy

Oil
The World Factbook: oil imports 2007, ranked 73 out of 207 countries
The World Factbook: oil consumption 2009, ranked 9 out of 207 countries
The World Factbook: oil exports 2007, ranked 1 out of 209 countries
The World Factbook: oil production 2009, ranked 2 out of 208 countries
The World Factbook: proven oil reserves 2010, ranked 1 out of 204 countries

Natural gas
The World Factbook: natural gas imports 2008, ranked 135 out of 204 countries
The World Factbook: natural gas consumption 2009, ranked 11 out of 209 countries
The World Factbook: natural gas exports 208, ranked 130 out of 205 countries
The World Factbook: natural gas production 2009, ranked 11 out of 207 countries
The World Factbook: natural gas proven reserves 2010, ranked 5 out of 205 countries

Environment
 Yale University Center for Environmental Law and Policy and Columbia University Center for International Earth Science Information Network: Environmental Sustainability Index, ranked out of 145 countries
 US Department of Energy: CO² emissions per capita 2004, ranked out of 206 countries
The World Factbook: water resources ranked out of 174 countries

Geography
 Total area ranked out of 234 countries

Globalization
KOF: Index of Globalization 2007, ranked out of 122 countries
A.T. Kearney/Foreign Policy Magazine: Globalization Index 2006, ranked out of 62 countries

Industry
OICA automobile production 2007, ranked out of 51 countries The first country of the Arab World to invest in industrial heritage, 2019, International Committee for the Conservation of the Industrial Heritage.

Military
Center for Strategic and International Studies: active troops ranked out of 166 countries

National Brand

Politics
 Transparency International: Corruption Perceptions Index, ranked 80th out of 180 countries
 Reporters without borders: Worldwide press freedom index, ranked 163 out of 167 countries
The Economist Democracy Index 2007, ranked 161 out of 167 countries

Society
 Save the Children: State of the World's Mothers report 2006, ranked out of 110 countries
World Health Organization: Suicide rate ranked out of 100 countries

Technology
 OECD: number of broadband Internet users 2007, ranked out of the 30 OECD countries
Brown University Taubman Center for Public Policy 2006: ranked in online government services
Internet Freedom
The 1st rank in the Arab World in the Global Cybersecurity Index
The 13th worldwide rank in Global Cybersecurity Index

Transportation

Other

References

Saudi Arabia